Act IV or Act Four may refer to:
 Act IV, music venue Music of Washington, D.C.
 Act Four (The Seldom Scene album)
 Act IV: Rebirth in Reprise, a 2015 album by the Dear Hunter